Stigmaphyllon is a genus in the Malpighiaceae, a family of about 75 genera of flowering plants in the order Malpighiales. Amazonvine is a common name for species in this genus.

Distribution
Stigmaphyllon subg. Stigmaphyllon comprises 92 species of mostly twining woody vines or rarely shrubs native to the Neotropics from southern Mexico to northern Argentina, except Chile and the high Andes; 13 species occur in the West Indies. One species (S. bannisterioides) is also found in seashore vegetation along the Atlantic Coast from southern Mexico to northern Brazil, in the West Indies, and along the coast of western Africa (Guinea Bissau, Guinea, Sierra Leone).

Stigmaphyllon subg. Ryssopterys includes 21 species of woody vines of the Sunda Islands (except Borneo and Sumatra), New Guinea, Queensland (Australia), New Caledonia, Vanuatu, the Solomon Islands, Micronesia, Palau, and the Philippines; S. timoriense has also been recorded from Taiwan and the Ryukyu Islands.

Threatened species
Three species from Ecuador, Stigmaphyllon ecuadorense (erroneously listed as Stigmaphyllon ecudorense), Stigmaphyllon eggersii, and Stigmaphyllon nudiflorum, are included in the 2006 IUCN Red List of Threatened Species.

References

Anderson, C. 1997. Monograph of Stigmaphyllon (Malpighiaceae). Systematic Botany Monographs 51: 1–313.
Anderson, C. 2000. Stigmaphyllon hispidum (Malpighiaceae), a new species from Bahia, Brazil. Novon 10(2): 107–109.
Anderson, C. 2009. Stigmaphyllon lanceolatum (Malpighiaceae), a new species from Espírito Santo, Brazil. Harvard Papers in Botany 14: 193–196.
Anderson, C. 2011. Revision of Ryssopterys and transfer to Stigmaphyllon (Malpighiaceae). Blumea 56: 73–104.

External links
Herbarium.umich.edu: Malpighiaceae — description, taxonomy, phylogeny, and nomenclature.

 
Malpighiaceae genera
Taxonomy articles created by Polbot